Liberty Vittert is an American statistician, political commentator, and host of Liberty’s Great American Cookbook, a cooking show on UK Television.

Vittert is a Professor of the Practice of Data Science at the Olin Business School at Washington University in St. Louis. She is also a Senior Fellow at the Harvard Data Science Initiative and the feature editor of the Harvard Data Science Review. She is the host of MIT's Data Science Podcast, "Data Nation" hosted by the MIT Institute for Data Systems and Society. Previously, Vittert served as the Mitchell Lecturer at the University of Glasgow’s School of Mathematics and Statistics. She is also a Faculty Scholar at the Institute for Public Health and she was a visiting scholar at Columbia University . In 2022, Vittert was named one of the Top 50 Undergraduate Professors in the United States by Poets and Quants.

Experience 
After graduating from MIT with a degree in mathematics and the University of Glasgow’s School of Mathematics and Statistics in 2015, Vittert was named a Mitchell Lecturer (Associate Professor) at the university, specializing in facial recognition and probability. Vittert and team have been credited with working on a project to revolutionize the care of children with facial deformities in developing countries.

A frequent contributor on cable news networks, Vittert is an expert on data, disinformation, election polling, and the refugee crisis. Vittert is the resident weekly On-Air statistician for her brother Leland Vittert's program News Nation “On Balance”. She has appeared on Fox News Channel, PBS, BBC, and other news channels to discuss political issues. Her opinion editorials regularly appear on Fox News and have been featured in US News, CBS News, Newsweek, The Conversation and as a general contributor to Business Insider. Vittert's investigative article on lottery profits was the number one news trending story in the country. Vittert has a regular column on Fox Business called "A Statistician's Guide to Life".

In 2015, Vittert joined the board of USA for the United Nations High Commissioner for Refugees (UNHCR). Vittert also serves on the board of UNHCR’s Project Hive. In 2020, Vittert was appointed to the International Advisory Council of the United Nations Migration Agency (USA for IOM).

Her cooking show, Liberty’s Great American Cookbook, utilizes cooking from Le Cordon Bleu Paris and has aired nationwide in Scotland on STV since 2016.

As a feature editor of the Harvard Data Science Review, Vittert is the co-host of the Harvard Data Science Review Podcast.

Vittert is an Ambassador for the  Royal Statistical Society, a named BBC Expert Woman in Mathematics, and an Elected Member  of the International Statistical Institute (ISI).

Education 
Vittert earned her B.S. in Mathematics and a Concentration in Political Science from the Massachusetts Institute of Technology. She received her Ph.D. from the University of Glasgow’s School of Mathematics and Statistics, in addition to a Diplome de Patisserie et Cuisine de Base from Le Cordon Bleu Paris.

Personal life 
Vittert was raised in St. Louis, Missouri. In 2002, Vittert won the National One Design World Championship as crew. She was named one of the "Coolest People in Scotland" in 2018 by the Herald. Her brother, Leland Vittert, is an Emmy-nominated anchor on NewsNation.

References 

American women statisticians
Massachusetts Institute of Technology School of Science alumni
Alumni of the University of Glasgow
Academics of the University of Glasgow
Washington University in St. Louis faculty
Washington University in St. Louis mathematicians
American political commentators
People from St. Louis
Year of birth missing (living people)
Living people